Carol A. Cartwright is an American academic administrator and former president of Bowling Green State University. She became interim president in July 2008, president on January 6, 2009, and retired in June, 2011.  During her time as President, the University continued a trend of declining enrollment caused by the Great Recession and saw one of the smallest Fall Freshman class in its history.

She served as the 10th president and first woman president of Kent State University (March 1991-July 2006).  Cartwright was previously the vice chancellor for Academic Affairs at the University of California at Davis and dean for undergraduate programs and vice provost at The Pennsylvania State University.

In 2010 Dr. Cartwright was elected as vice chair to NPR.

Dr. Cartwright earned master's and doctoral degrees from the University of Pittsburgh and her bachelor's degree from the University of Wisconsin–Whitewater.

Notes

Year of birth missing (living people)
Living people
Presidents of Kent State University
Pennsylvania State University faculty
University of California, Davis faculty
University of Pittsburgh alumni
University of Wisconsin–Whitewater alumni
Bowling Green State University faculty